Róger Krug Guedes (born 2 October 1996), is a Brazilian footballer who plays as a forward for Corinthians.

Club career

Criciúma
Born in Ibirubá, Rio Grande do Sul, Guedes started his career with Grêmio's youth setup, but was released in 2011. He moved to Criciúma shortly after, and finished his formation with the club. Guedes made his first team debut on 23 November 2014, coming on as a half-time substitute in a 1–1 away draw against Flamengo in Série A; he also assisted Cléber Santana for the equalising goal. His first senior goal came on 6 December, as he scored the equalizer in a 2–1 loss at Corinthians.

Guedes was promoted to the main squad ahead of the 2015 campaign, with his side now in the Série B.

Palmeiras
On 5 April 2016, Guedes signed a five-year contract with Palmeiras in the top tier; Verdão paid R$ 2.5 million for 25% of his federative rights. He made his debut for the club 14 days later, replacing Alecsandro in a 2–0 Campeonato Paulista home win against São Bernardo FC. Guedes scored during his top tier debut for the club on 14 May, netting the first in a 4–0 home routing of Atlético Paranaense. He scored four goals in 31 appearances during the season, as his side was crowned champions. On 31 January 2017, Guedes renewed his contract with Palmeiras, receiving a pay rise to upgrade his release clause.

In 2017, a video emerged of a Palmeiras training session where Guedes is seen taking part in a fitness session on a practise pitch from afar. His teammates would proceed to chase him off the pitch before pinning him to the ground and tying him up with wire with coaching staff and manager Cuca looking on. According to Guedes, this was not the first time he was physically harassed by Palmeiras players and that the justification for such cruelty was to toughen him up for big games.

On 27 December 2017, Guedes joined Atlético Mineiro on a season-long loan swap deal involving him and Marcos Rocha. He has said that the harassment he received while at Palmeiras by his teammates was the reason for the loan move.

Shandong Luneng Taishan
On 13 July 2018, Guedes was loaned to Chinese Super League side Shandong Luneng Taishan for one year with an obligation to buy for €9.6 million. He made his debut for the club on 28 July in a 1-1 draw with Jiangsu Suning. After the loan move was made permanent, he would establish himself as a vital member of the team, being part of the team that won the 2020 Chinese FA Cup against Jiangsu in a 2-0 victory.

Corinthians

On 27 August 2021, Guedes signed with Brazilian club Corinthians, after rescinding with Shandong. Uniquely, he wore the number 123 jersey in his first season, because the number 23 (which he usually wears in honour of his son's birthday) was already taken by Fagner. After that, Guedes wore the number 9 jersey for the most part of 2022 season, later changing his jersey to number 10 when Willian rescinded his contract with Corinthians.

Career statistics
.

Honours
Palmeiras
 Campeonato Brasileiro Série A: 2016

Shandong Luneng
 Chinese FA Cup: 2020

References

External links

Róger Guedes profile at Palmeiras' official website 

1996 births
Living people
Sportspeople from Rio Grande do Sul
Brazilian footballers
Brazilian expatriate footballers
Association football forwards
Campeonato Brasileiro Série A players
Campeonato Brasileiro Série B players
Criciúma Esporte Clube players
Sociedade Esportiva Palmeiras players
Clube Atlético Mineiro players
Sport Club Corinthians Paulista players
Chinese Super League players
Shandong Taishan F.C. players
Expatriate footballers in China
Brazilian expatriate sportspeople in China